Oranienplatz is a square in Kreuzberg, Berlin, Germany.

From 2012 until 2014 it was the site of the OPlatz (Oranienplatz) Movement pro-immigration protest encampment.

References

External links
 

Friedrichshain-Kreuzberg
Squares in Berlin